Qarah Dash or Qareh Dash may refer to:

Qarah Dash, East Azerbaijan
Qarah Dash, Markazi
Qarah Dash, Qazvin
Qarah Dash, Razavi Khorasan
Qarah Dash, West Azerbaijan
Qarah Dash, Zanjan
Qarah Dash Parchik